Salam Mohamed Abdul Salam (born 29 September 1958) is a Bangladeshi swimmer. He competed in the men's 100 metre butterfly at the 1988 Summer Olympics, finishing in 48th place.

References

External links
 

1958 births
Living people
Bangladeshi male swimmers
Olympic swimmers of Bangladesh
Swimmers at the 1988 Summer Olympics
Place of birth missing (living people)